Donald Francis Lippert (June 12, 1957) is a Roman Catholic bishop.

Born in Pittsburgh, Pennsylvania, United States, Lippert was ordained a priest on June 8, 1985, for the Capuchin order. On November 22, 2011, Lippert was appointed bishop of the Roman Catholic Diocese of Mendi, Papua New Guinea and was ordained a bishop on February 4, 2012.

Notes

External links

1957 births
Living people
Religious leaders from Pittsburgh
Capuchin bishops
American Roman Catholic bishops by contiguous area of the United States
21st-century Roman Catholic bishops in Papua New Guinea
Roman Catholic bishops of Mendi
American expatriate bishops
American expatriates in Papua New Guinea